Mirja Viveka Turestedt (born 24 September 1972 in Borås (grew up in Malmö and Gothenburg)) is a Swedish actress.

Turestedt studied at Gothenburg Theatre Academy 1998–2002. She appeared in Slott i Sverige at the Royal Dramatic Theatre until November 2010 and in 2011 she appeared in Tartuffe at Stockholm City Theatre.

Selected filmography
2019 -  Arctic Crimes 
2009 - The Girl Who Kicked the Hornets' Nest (Luftslottet som sprängdes) as Monica Figuerola2009 - A Midsummer Night’s Party2008 - Les Grandes Personnes2008 - Oskyldigt dömd (TV)
2007 - The Truth About Marika (TV)
2007 - Labyrint (TV)
2007 - Arn – The Knight Templar2003 - Kvinnor emellan (TV)
2003 - Lejontämjaren2003 - Kommissarie Winter (TV)
2003 - De drabbade (TV)
2002 - Pepparrotslandet'' (TV)

References

External links

Mirja Turestedt at the Swedish Film Database
Mirja Turestedt on the Royal Dramatic Theatre's website
Official website

Living people
1972 births
People from Borås
Swedish film actresses
Swedish television actresses
21st-century Swedish actresses